Georg Zipfel (born 13 May 1953) is a German cross-country skier. He competed in the men's 15 kilometre event at the 1976 Winter Olympics.

References

External links
 

1953 births
Living people
German male cross-country skiers
Olympic cross-country skiers of West Germany
Cross-country skiers at the 1976 Winter Olympics
Sportspeople from Freiburg im Breisgau